Evgeniy Malinin (Russian: Евгений Малинин, born 8 September 1986) is a Kyrgyzstan footballer

He is a member of the Kyrgyzstan national football team.

Club career stats
Last update: 16 March 2008

External links

1986 births
Living people
Kyrgyzstani footballers
Expatriate footballers in Kazakhstan
Kyrgyzstani expatriate footballers
FC Kairat players
FC Zhenis Astana players
Kyrgyzstani expatriate sportspeople in Kazakhstan
Sumgayit FK players
Footballers at the 2006 Asian Games
Association football midfielders
Asian Games competitors for Kyrgyzstan
Kyrgyzstan international footballers
FC Megasport players